The 1998 Esiliiga is the eighth season of the Esiliiga, second-highest Estonian league for association football clubs, since its establishment in 1992.

Final table

Promotion playoff

JK Eesti Põlevkivi Jõhvi beat KSK Vigri Tallinn 2–0 on aggregate. Eesti Põlevkivi remained in Meistriliiga, Vigri in Esiliiga.

Relegation playoff

FC Kuressaare beat FC M.C. Tallinn 2–1 on aggregate. Kuressaare remained in Esiliiga, M.C. in Second Division.

See also
 1998 Meistriliiga
 1998 in Estonian football

Esiliiga seasons
2
Estonia
Estonia